Yele Mallappa Shetty Lake is one of the largest lakes in Bangalore, located on the eastern side of the city, outside of KR Puram. It is an artificial water reservoir constructed in early 1900s.

Geography
The lake is located in North-East Bangalore, near Whitefield. The 260 acre Yele Mallappa Shetty lake is one of the largest lakes in Bangalore. The lake has the Old Madras Road passing through it.

History
Yele Mallappa Shetty Lake derives its name from a leading philanthropist of 1900s by the name of Yele Mallappa Shetty. In the late 19th century when the city was suffering from a great drought, Yele Mallappa Shetty, a betel leaf merchant, generously donated a large part of his wealth to the construction of a tank to harvest rainwater and provide respite to the people.

Due to rapid growth of Bangalore urban area, Yele Mallappa Shetty Lake has been getting encroached over the time. The multi-storey apartments in its watershed region, which are constantly feeding stormwater drains completely but are also letting untreated sewage directly into it. Even industries from surrounding areas started dumping their waste into the lake.

In December 2017 a sewage treatment plant at Seegehalli was inaugurated to help treat 15 million litres of sewage water per day (MLD) generated at KR Puram, Hoodi, Mahadevapura, Bhattarahalli, Devasandra, Sadaramangala and Medhalli. Currently, the Bangalore Water Supply and Sewerage Board supplies treated sewage to neighboring regions such as Chikkaballapur, Kolar and Anekal for irrigation purpose.

Water quality
In 2015 a study on water quality at the lake was conducted. With regard to the lakes physico-chemical characteristics, observations were made three times in a year representing three different seasons. The samples were collected from three different places of the lake.

Following are the observations from the report:
Physico-chemical analysis: Lake water contains different types of floating, dissolved, suspended and microbiological as well as bacteriological impurities
 Temperature: Neither too high nor too low
 pH: Normal range
 Electrical Conductivity (EC): Higher side; indicating higher levels of alkalinity
 Dissolved oxygen (DO): Lower than the standard
 Bio-chemical Oxygen Demand (BOD): Moderate
 Chemical oxygen demand (COD): Exceeded the limit in most of the samples. It clearly indicates the presence of high levels of dissolved contaminants
 Hardness: Very high
 Alkalinity: Higher side
 Sodium: Concentration of sodium was found to be lower
 Potassium: The concentration of potassium was high
 Phosphate: Comparatively high amount of phosphate was recorded due to the discharge of municipality sewage and dumping of domestic waste into the lakes
 Nitrate: Relatively larger amount of nitrate was found

Flora and fauna
The lake is a biological hotspot for migratory birds, some of the usually spotted birds are golden oriole, northern shoveler, Asian green bee-eater, bulbul, pied kingfisher, egrets, and Eurasian coot. A species from the genus Oscillatoria and water hyacinth were found dominant in a 2015 study.

References
Citations

External links 

Reservoirs in Karnataka
Lakes of Bangalore
Bird sanctuaries of Karnataka